Frank Doyle may refer to:

 Frank Doyle (banker) (1863–1948), founded Exchange Bank of California and Doyle Scholarship
 Frank Doyle (writer) (1917–1996), writer for Archie Comics
 Frank Doyle (politician) (1922–1984), Australian politician
 Frank Doyle (MythBusters), explosives expert and former FBI agent, and frequent guest on MythBusters
 Francis J. Doyle III, American chemical engineer, known as Frank 
 Frank Doyle (ice hockey) (born 1980), Canadian ice hockey goaltender

See also
 Francis Doyle (disambiguation)